James Hamblin (born 16 August 1978) is an English cricketer. He is a right-handed batsman and a right-arm medium-pace bowler. His father, Bryan Hamblin, played first-class cricket for Oxford University.

James Hamblin played first-class cricket in 11 matches for Hampshire between 2001 and 2003, having previously played in 1997 for Sussex in the Second XI championship. His best first-class performances with both bat and ball came in his last match for Hampshire, against Derbyshire at Derby. He took six for 93 in Derbyshire's first innings and scored 96 batting at No 7 in Hampshire's first innings total of 580.

Hamblin played regularly for Hampshire's one-day sides in List A matches between 2001 and 2004, appearing 48 times for the county. But most of his other cricket was at Second XI level. He was released by Hampshire at the end of the 2004 season.

References

External links
James Hamblin at Cricket Archive
James Hamblin at Cricinfo

1978 births
English cricketers
Hampshire cricketers
Living people
Hampshire Cricket Board cricketers